Defamer may refer to:
One who defames
Defamer.com